Nandini Nair is an Indian television personality, talk show host, performer, television anchor, and a professional disc jockey and radio jockey under the stage name DJ Envy. She appears on her talk show Hello Namaste. She appeared in the film Aedan directed by Sanju Surendran.

Early life 

She started her profession in the industry working as a Video Jockey for Asianet Dubai. She has also been hosting shows in India and abroad. Before taking up Hello Namaste, a celebrity chat show, she was an RJ for about one and a half years. She is also a DJ. She was a resident DJ for Crowne Plaza Cochin and people nicknamed her as "DJ Lady Envy"

Filmography

Short films

Television

References 

People from Thiruvalla
Living people
Year of birth missing (living people)
Actresses in Malayalam cinema
Indian DJs
Actresses in Malayalam television